"Everybody on the Floor (Pump It)" is a song by the German electronic dance music duo Tokyo Ghetto Pussy, an alias of Jam & Spoon. It was released in 1994 as the lead single from their album, Disco 2001. The song was a success in a number of countries, particularly in Australia, Belgium and Finland, where it reached the top 10.

Track listing
 "Everybody on the Floor (Pump It)" (Luvdup in Osaka Mix) – 7:25
 "Everybody on the Floor (Pump It)" (Luvdup in Tokyo Mix) – 7:45
 "Everybody on the Floor (Pump It)" (Sure Is Pure in Tokyo Mix) – 8:34
 "Everybody on the Floor (Pump It)" (Sure Is Pure in Osaka Mix) – 8:34

Charts

Weekly charts

Year-end charts

Certifications

References

1994 songs
1994 singles
Jam & Spoon songs